Oeonistis entella, the lichen moth, is a moth of the family Erebidae. It was described by Pieter Cramer in 1779. It is found in southern India and Sri Lanka.

Gallery

References

Moths described in 1779
Lithosiina